Johnny Tremain is a work of historical fiction written in 1943 by Esther Forbes that is set in Boston prior to and during the outbreak of the American Revolution. Intended for teen-aged readers, the novel's themes include apprenticeship, courtship, sacrifice, human rights, and the growing tension between Patriots and Loyalists as conflict nears. Events depicted in the novel include the Boston Tea Party, the British blockade of the Port of Boston, the midnight ride of Paul Revere, and the Battles of Lexington and Concord.

The book won the 1944 Newbery Medal and was believed to be "among the 20 best-selling children's books of the 20th century." It was estimated to be the 16th-bestselling children's paperback book as of the year 2001 in the United States, according to Publishers Weekly. In 1957, Walt Disney Pictures released a film adaptation, also called Johnny Tremain.

Plot summary
Johnny Tremain is a promising but prideful 14-year-old apprentice at the Boston silversmith shop of elderly Ephraim Lapham. The date is on July 23, 1773. It is understood that someday Johnny will marry Mr. Lapham's granddaughter Priscilla to keep the shop within the Lapham family. The shop receives a challenging and urgent order from wealthy merchant John Hancock to make a silver dish to replace one that Mr. Lapham fashioned decades before. While preparing Hancock's order, Johnny's hand is badly burned when Dove, another apprentice resentful of Johnny, deliberately gives him a cracked crucible that leaks molten silver. Johnny's hand is burned and crippled beyond use, and he can no longer be a silversmith. Johnny's youthful pride is crushed by the injury. He is relegated to work as an unskilled errand boy. He goes to find a new job that will accept his crippled hand.

After a series of rejections, Johnny reaches the low point of his young life. While searching for jobs, he encounters in a printshop Rab Silsbee, a young typesetter who is friendly to him. He then decides to turn to Mr. Lyte, a wealthy Boston merchant. Johnny explains that his mother told him that he and Mr. Lyte are related and as a last resort, to turn to him for help. Lyte requests the proof, and Johnny shows him a silver cup with the Lyte family's crest. Lyte says it was stolen from him in a burglary, and Johnny is accused of the theft and arrested. Eventually, Johnny is freed by the court after Rab brings Cilla to court and she testifies that Johnny showed her his cup before the burglary ever took place.

Johnny settles into a job delivering a weekly newspaper, the Boston Observer. The Observer is a Whig publication, and Johnny is introduced to the larger world of pre-revolutionary Boston politics by Rab. Johnny learns to ride and care for Goblin, a beautiful but skittish horse used to make deliveries. He moves in with Rab in the attic of the newspaper's shop.

As months pass and tension between Whigs and Tories rises, Johnny becomes a dedicated Whig. He matures and re-evaluates many personal relationships, including that with Cilla, who becomes a trusted friend and fellow Whig. Johnny and Rab participate in the Boston Tea Party, in which patriot colonists throw a shipload of tea into the harbor rather than allow the ship's owner to unload the tea and pay a tax imposed by Parliament without the consent of the people of Britain's American colonies. In retaliation, Britain sends an army of Redcoats to occupy Boston and closes the port, inflicting hardship upon the inhabitants of this commercial and trading town. Rab decides to leave the Observer and become a soldier, taking with him a musket that Johnny acquired for him. At the end of the book, Johnny meets and talks briefly with his friend one last time: Facing the British, Rab is mortally wounded in battle. No longer needing the musket, Rab returns it to Johnny with a stoic smile. A Patriot doctor offers to perform surgery to fix Johnny's hand so he can fire the gun against the Redcoats, and the story ends with Johnny's acceptance of the offer.

Characters
The novel features both fictional and historical characters.

Fictional
 Johnny Tremain: The story's protagonist. Born Jonathan Lyte Tremain, he is a likable but cocky young teenager, a talented apprentice silversmith indentured at the age of 12 to Ephraim Lapham for seven years. Johnny was born in a convent in France. He returned with his mother Lavinia "Vinny" Lyte Tremain to Townsend, Maine, when she was certain she would no longer be recognized as a Lyte. Because his right hand is badly injured by molten silver, he is forced to seek another trade. 
 Rab Silsbee: Johnny's first true friend and role model. He is two years older than Johnny, taller, more mature, resourceful, brave, and admired, especially by Johnny. He does not mind Johnny's crippled hand. He introduces Johnny to the politics of Boston, where he is a member of the Sons of Liberty. He treats Cilla kindly, but mostly to tease Johnny. Rab is a Silsbee, known for their dignified aloof reserve, but a fervent, well-spoken Patriot. Rab drills with the Minutemen of Lexington and takes part in the Battle of Lexington where he is mortally wounded.
 Priscilla "Cilla" Lapham: Priscilla Lapham is slightly younger than Johnny. Unlike her older sisters, she is petite and a blossoming beauty. Before Johnny's accident, it is arranged that she and Johnny will marry. Over time, Cilla and Johnny develop a genuine love for each other. She is Mrs. Lapham's third daughter.
 Isannah "Izzy" Lapham: The youngest daughter of Mrs. Lapham, Isannah is a beautiful but frail child of nine who needs close caring for at all times. Once-sweet Isannah is beloved by her older sister, Cilla, but eventually becomes selfish and vain, with a reputation for parroting other's words and not being an independent thinker. Isannah's golden-haired, brown-eyed beauty attracts a great deal of attention, most significantly from Lavinia Lyte. Lavinia takes Isannah as her protege and introduces her to high society, separating her from her family and their working class way of life.
 Ephraim Lapham: A British silversmith, and Johnny's master at the beginning of the novel. Mr. Lapham is pious and kind, but old, frail, and no longer the master smith of his youth. He dies soon after Johnny leaves his apprenticeship.
 Mr. Percival Tweedie: A 40-year-old from Baltimore, Maryland, who becomes Mr. Lapham's business partner after Johnny's accident. Mr. Tweedie is a "queer" man, unliked by many. Johnny calls him a "Squeak-Pig". 
 Mrs. Lapham, later Mrs. Tweedie: Ephraim Lapham's widowed daughter-in-law. Mrs. Lapham is a dedicated, hardworking mother and a no-nonsense taskmaster to the apprentices. She works as the housekeeper in Mr. Lapham's house and shop. When none of her daughters will do so, she marries Mr. Tweedie to keep the silversmith shop in the Lapham family.
 Dorcas Lapham: Mrs. Lapham's second daughter. Although the stocky Dorcas longs to be elegant and sophisticated, she falls in love with the poverty-stricken Frizel, Jr., and elopes to avoid marrying Mr. Tweedie.
 Madge Lapham: Mrs. Lapham's oldest daughter. Like Mrs. Lapham, Madge is tough and capable. She falls in love and elopes with Sergeant Gale, a British soldier. Madge, like Dorcas, was engaged to marry Mr. Tweedie and elopes with Sergeant Gale to avoid marrying him.
 Dove: An apprentice in the Lapham shop and rival of Johnny whose first name had been forgotten. He is older than Johnny, stupid and given to malicious behavior, and has been an apprentice two years longer but still can only perform menial duties. Dove both resents and looks up to Johnny. He attempts to steal tea during the Boston Tea Party, but is caught and thrown overboard into the harbor. After Mr. Lapham dies, Dove takes a job caring for British officers' horses during Boston's occupation. Johnny despises Dove and cannot bring himself to forgive him as Mr. Lapham counseled, but his thirst for revenge dissipates when Dove is persistently abused by his Redcoat masters.
 Dusty Miller: Mr. Lapham's youngest apprentice. Before Johnny's accident, Dusty idolized him. After Johnny leaves the silversmith shop, Dusty runs away to sea.
 Mr. Lorne: Rab's master and uncle by marriage. Mr. Lorne owns the print shop that publishes the Boston Observer, a seditious Whig (Patriot) newspaper.
 Mrs. Jenifer Lorne: Mr. Lorne's wife and Rab's aunt. Mrs. Lorne sees through Johnny's arrogant exterior to treat him as a lonely boy. She becomes like a mother to him and is the mother of an infant son who is unmistakably a Silsbee. Johnny nicknames him "Rabbit", as a word play on Rab's name.
 Jonathan Lyte: A wealthy Boston merchant and Johnny's great-uncle. Crooked and cruel, Lyte tries to make a profit by making friends on both sides of the colonial struggle, the Loyalists and the Patriots, but as tensions mount in Boston, Lyte is exposed as a Tory (Loyalist). He becomes gravely ill after his country home in Milton is attacked by a Patriot mob. On the eve of war, Lyte and his family depart for London.
 Lavinia Lyte: Jonathan Lyte's beautiful daughter, just returned from living in London. Lavinia is the most desirable socialite in Boston. Enchanted by Isannah's ethereal beauty, Lavinia Lyte takes the child away from her family to live amidst the wealth of the Lyte household as a sort of pet. She is also Johnny's cousin, which she reveals at the end of the book.  
 Mrs. Bessie: The Lytes' cook and Cilla's only friend in the Lyte household. Mrs. Bessie is an ardent Whig and a confidante of Samuel Adams, but she nonetheless remains loyal to her Tory employers. When the Lytes leave Boston, Bessie and Cilla are left behind to look after their house. Johnny admires Mrs. Bessie.
 Lavinia "Vinny" Lyte Tremain: Johnny's mother. She dies before the novel begins. She was born Lavinia Lyte, a name favored for Lyte females, and was a beautiful but impetuously wild young woman. The family turned her out for eloping with Charles Tremain.
 Charles Tremain: Johnny's father. Charles Tremain was a French naval surgeon taken as a British prisoner of war during the French and Indian War. While he was held as a prisoner in Boston, using the name Dr. Latour out of shame at being a prisoner, he met and courted Johnny's mother. They eloped and were married aboard a ship traveling to Marseilles, France, where Charles died of cholera, and Johnny was born three months later.
 Lydia: The African washerwoman at the Afric Queen, a tavern where many British officers are quartered. Lydia is a rebel sympathizer who, because of her connection to the British soldiers, gathers information for the rebel forces. She is described as handsome by Johnny.
 Sewall: A poor relative of the Lytes who works as a clerk in Jonathan Lyte's office. Sewall is kind and brave; he runs off to join the Minute Men.
 Pumpkin: A British private soldier stationed in Boston. Pumpkin is a secret Whig whose dream is to own a piece of land and homestead a farm. Because he is poor, he can only achieve his dream in America. Johnny helps him desert from the army in exchange for his musket, to give to Rab.  As a Redcoat deserter, Pumpkin is captured by his former comrades and executed by a firing squad.
 Frizel, Junior: A young leather-dresser, Frizel, Junior is an accepted suitor for Mrs. Lapham's two eldest girls, Madge and Dorcas. Refusing to marry Mr. Tweedie, Dorcas runs off to get engaged with Frizel, Junior. 
 Sergeant Gale: A British non-commissioned officer who marries Madge Lapham, Mrs. Lapham's eldest daughter. He is noted to be short but tough.
 Lieutenant Stranger: A friendly but often haughty British officer stationed in Boston. He develops a mild friendship with Johnny. He is young, eager to fight, and reminds Johnny a lot of Rab.

Historical
 Samuel Adams: Political leader of the Revolutionary forces. He wrote numerous pamphlets inciting and inspiring the revolution.
 John Hancock: One of the wealthiest men in Boston and a leader of the Whigs. Johnny's hand is disfigured while making a silver basin for him.
 Doctor Joseph Warren: One of the leaders of the Whigs in Boston. In the novel's climax, he is shown preparing to operate on scar tissue in Johnny's disfigured hand. Foreshadowing indicates that the operation will be a success, allowing Johnny to enlist in the rebel army.
 Paul Revere: The best silversmith in Boston and an important Whig, known to American history for his midnight ride to caution the Minutemen of approaching British soldiers. He warns the Americans that the British are marching toward them, and they made a "target practice" for them at Lexington.
 James Otis, Jr.: A lawyer and architect of the ideals of the American Revolution; his career was shortened by bouts of insanity caused after being beaten about the head by a British soldier. In the novel, Otis inspires the Whig leaders to fight for the rights of all people, not just Americans. He warns that some will give their lives, foreshadowing the death of Rab.
 Governor Thomas Hutchinson: The governor of Massachusetts prior to the occupation by the British army.
 Thomas Gage: British General and military governor of Boston during the occupation.
 John Pitcairn and Francis Smith: British commanding officers at the Battles of Lexington and Concord.
 Josiah Quincy II: The young lawyer and member of the Sons of Liberty who defends Johnny in court when accused of theft by the Lytes.
 Doctor Benjamin Church: a physician ally of Samuel Adams.

Reception
Kirkus Reviews wrote, "This is delightful reading, but at the close it seems to leave less sense of substance and permanence than her best work (Paradise and Paul Revere), but to me it was more satisfying than The General's Lady or Mirror for Witches." Common Sense Media said that "this sweeping tale of redcoats and revolutionaries has a lot to offer" and remarked, "Forbes, a historian, writes with detail and precision, imbuing historical events with life and passion that is often lacking in textbooks."

Similar characters in other media
Another Johnny Tremaine (note the different spelling of the surname) was a different fictional character played by Rod Cameron in the 1949 Republic Pictures film Brimstone, written by Thames Williamson and Norman S. Hall. This second Tremaine was a U.S. Marshal who goes undercover to stop a cattle-smuggling ring. The release of Brimstone followed the awarding of the Newbery prize to the novel Johnny Tremain, but preceded the release of the 1957 film Johnny Tremain by Disney.

See also 
 List of films about the American Revolution
 List of television series and miniseries about the American Revolution

References

Fiction set in 1773
Fiction set in 1774
Fiction set in 1775
1943 American novels
American novels adapted into films
Novels set during the American Revolutionary War
Tremain, Johnny
Children's historical novels
Cultural depictions of John Hancock
American young adult novels
Cultural depictions of Paul Revere
Cultural depictions of Samuel Adams
Houghton Mifflin books
Tremain, Johnny
Newbery Medal–winning works
Novels set in Boston